Aenigmaticum is a genus of minute hooded beetles in the family Corylophidae. There are about five described species in Aenigmaticum.

Species
These five species belong to the genus Aenigmaticum:
 Aenigmaticum californicum Casey, 1889
 Aenigmaticum elongatum (LeConte, 1878)
 Aenigmaticum mexicanum Pakaluk, 1985
 Aenigmaticum prolatum Pakaluk, 1985
 Aenigmaticum ptilioides Matthews, 1888

References

Further reading

 
 
 

Corylophidae
Articles created by Qbugbot
Coccinelloidea genera